El Economista may refer to:

 El Economista (Mexico), Mexican business and economics newspaper
 El Economista (Spain), Spanish daily newspaper